Carla Harryman (born January 11, 1952) is an American poet, essayist, and playwright often associated with the Language poets. She teaches Creative Writing at Eastern Michigan University and serves on the MFA faculty of the Milton Avery School of the Arts at Bard College. She is married to the poet Barrett Watten.

Life and work
Born in Orange, California, Harryman studied at the University of California, Santa Barbara and San Francisco State University. In 1979, she co-founded the San Francisco Poets Theater, which staged numerous experimental plays, including her Third Man and other plays.

Harryman has received the Foundation for Contemporary Arts Grants to Artists award (2004) and other grants and awards from Fund for Poetry, Opera America Next Stage Grant (with composer Erling Wold), Alexander Gerbode Foundation, and the NEA Consortium Playwrights Commission, among others.

Harryman's work is known for genre-disrupting poetry, performance and prose. In addition to her work and her interdisciplinary collaborations, she has written numerous experimental essays and writings about contemporary innovative women’s writing and experimental language-centered performance and co-edited a book devoted to the work of Kathy Acker.

Publications
 Percentage, 1979, Tuumba (Berkeley, CA)
 Under the Bridge, 1980, This Press (Berkeley, CA)
 Property, 1982, Tuumba (Berkeley, CA)
 The Middle, 1983, Gaz Press (San Francisco, CA)
 Vice, 1986, Potes and Poets (Hartford, CT)
 Animal Instincts: Prose, Plays, Essays, 1989, This Press (Berkeley, CA)
 In the Mode of, 1992, Zasterle (Tenerife, Spain)
 Memory Play, 1994, O Books (Oakland, CA)
 There Never Was a Rose Without a Thorn, 1995, City Lights (San Francisco, CA)
 The Words: After Carl Sandburg's Rootabaga Stories and Jean-Paul Sartre, 1994, O Books (Oakland, CA)
 Gardener of Stars, 2001, Atelos (Berkeley, CA)
 Baby, 2005, Adventures in Poetry (New York, NY)
 Tourjours L’epine Est Sous La Rose, 2006, Ikko (Paris, France) Translation of There Never Was a Rose Without a Thorn. Translated by Martin Richet 
 Open Box (Improvisations), 2007, Belladonna Books, (Brooklyn, NY)
 Lust for Life: On the Writing of Kathy Acker, 2006, Verso (New York, NY and London, England): co-edited with Amy Scholder and Avital Ronell.
 Adorno's Noise, 2008, Essay Press (Ithaca, NY)
 The Wide Road (with Lyn Hejinian), 2011, Belladonna Books (New York, NY)
 W--/M--, 2013, SplitLevel Texts (Ann Arbor, MI)
 Artifact of Hope, 2017, Ordinance Series, Kenning Editions (Chicago, IL)
 L'impromptue de Hannah/Hannah Cut In, 2018. Translated by Abigail Lange, Joca Seria (Paris, France)
 Sue in Berlin, 2018, "To" Series, PURH (Rouen, France)
 Sue á Berlin, 2018. Translated by Sabine Huynh, "To" Series, PURH (Rouen, France)
 A Voice to Perform, 2020, SplitLevel Texts (Alexandria, VA)

References

External links
Book Rags
Carla Harryman at EPC
From Gardener of Stars - a novel

1952 births
Living people
People from Orange, California
Eastern Michigan University faculty
Wayne State University faculty
University of California, Santa Barbara alumni
San Francisco State University alumni
Language poets
American women poets
20th-century American poets
American feminist writers
20th-century American women writers
American women academics
21st-century American women